The 2013–14 Houston Rockets season was the 47th season of the franchise in the National Basketball Association (NBA), and the 43rd based in Houston. The season is best remembered for acquiring All-Star Dwight Howard from the Los Angeles Lakers. With Howard teamed up with team captain James Harden, they gelled their first season together, being named as starters for the 2014 NBA All-Star Game. With Howard now as co-captain, the Rockets improved on last season and finished with a 54–28 record, finishing 4th in the Western Conference. They met the Portland Trail Blazers in the first round, but the presences of Howard and Harden were not enough as Houston fell in six games, thanks to a Damian Lillard series-clinching three pointer in Game 6.

Point guard Jeremy Lin, who was co-captain last year, was moved to a sixth man role, as Patrick Beverley earned the starting position. After the season, Lin was traded to the Los Angeles Lakers, and his two-year tenure with Houston came to an end. Along with Lin was Chandler Parsons who became a free agent and later signed with the Dallas Mavericks and center Omer Asik who, after two seasons with the team, was traded to the New Orleans Pelicans.

Draft picks

Roster

Pre-season

|- style="background:#fbb;"
| 1 
| October 5
| New Orleans
| 
| James Harden (21)
| Dwight Howard (9)
| Patrick Beverley (5)
| Toyota Center15,049
| 0–1
|- style="background:#cfc;"
| 2 
| October 10
| @ Indiana
| 
| James Harden (21)
| Omri Casspi (10)
| Jeremy Lin (5)
| Mall of Asia Arena12,885
| 1–1
|- style="background:#cfc;"
| 3 
| October 13
| Indiana
| 
| James Harden (21)
| Omri Casspi (9)
| Patrick Beverley (5)
| Taipei Arena13,686
| 2–1
|- style="background:#cfc;"
| 4 
| October 16
| Orlando
| 
| James Harden (21)
| Patrick Beverley (9)
| Casspi & Brooks (5)
| Toyota Center12,341
| 3–1
|- style="background:#cfc;"
| 5
| October 21
| Dallas
| 
| James Harden (19)
| Dwight Howard (17)
| Jeremy Lin (8)
| Toyota Center13,380
| 4–1
|- style="background:#cfc;"
| 6 
| October 24
| @ San Antonio
| 
| James Harden (22)
| Dwight Howard (16)
| James Harden (11)
| AT&T Center16,247
| 5–1
|- style="background:#cfc;"
| 8
| October 23
| @ Memphis
| 
| Omri Casspi (11)
| Dwight Howard (10)
| Chandler Parsons (5)
| FedExForum12,271
| 6–1

Regular season

Game log

|- style="background:#cfc;"
| 1 || October 30 || Charlotte
| 
| James Harden (21)
| Dwight Howard (26)
| James Harden (5)
| Toyota Center18,083
| 1–0

|- style="background:#cfc;"
| 2 || November 1 || Dallas
| 
| James Harden (34)
| Dwight Howard (16)
| Jeremy Lin (4)
| Toyota Center18,142
| 2–0	
|- style="background:#cfc;"								
| 3 || November 2 || @ Utah
| 
| Chandler Parsons (24)
| Chandler Parsons (12)
| Chandler Parsons (6)
| EnergySolutions Arena19,498
| 3–0
|- style="background:#fcc;"								
| 4 || November 4 || @ L.A Clippers
| 
| Omri Casspi (19)
| Howard & Casspi (9)
| Jeremy Lin (8)
| Staples Center19,404
| 3–1	
|- style="background:#cfc;"								
| 5 || November 5 || @ Portland
| 
| James Harden (33)
| Dwight Howard (13)
| Omri Casspi (5)
| Moda Center17,491
| 4–1	
|- style="background:#fcc;"								
| 6 || November 7 || L.A Lakers
| 
| James Harden (35)
| Dwight Howard (14)
| James Harden (5)
| Toyota Center18,133
| 4–2	
|- style="background:#fcc;"								
| 7 || November 9 || L.A Clippers
| 
| Chandler Parsons (23)
| Howard & Parsons (8)
| Jeremy Lin (7)
| Toyota Center18,108
| 4–3	
|- style="background:#cfc;"								
| 8 || November 11 || Toronto
| 
| Jeremy Lin (31)
| Dwight Howard (24)
| James Harden (10)
| Toyota Center18,134
| 5–3	
|- style="background:#fcc;"								
| 9 || November 13 || @ Philadelphia
| 
| Jeremy Lin (34)
| Dwight Howard (15)
| Jeremy Lin (12)
| Wells Fargo Center11,671
| 5–4	
|- style="background:#cfc;"								
| 10 || November 14 || @ New York
| 
| James Harden (36)
| Dwight Howard (15)
| Jeremy Lin (3)
| Madison Square Garden19,812
| 6–4	
|- style="background:#cfc;"							
| 11 || November 16 || Denver
| 
| Dwight Howard (25)
| Terrence Jones (12)
| James Harden (9)
| Toyota Center18,147
| 7–4	
|- style="background:#cfc;"								
| 12 || November 19 || Boston
| 
| Terrence Jones (24)
| Dwight Howard (12)
| Chandler Parsons (6)
| Toyota Center18,232
| 8–4	
|- style="background:#fcc;"								
| 13 || November 20 || @ Dallas
| 
| Dwight Howard (33)
| Dwight Howard (11)
| Chandler Parsons (11)
| American Airlines Center20,045
| 8–5	
|- style="background:#cfc;"							
| 14 || November 23 || Minnesota
| 
| Aaron Brooks (26)
| Dwight Howard (13)
| Lin & Brooks (5)
| Toyota Center18,196
| 9–5
|- style="background:#cfc;"								
| 15 || November 25 || @ Memphis
| 
| Chandler Parsons (17)
| Ömer Aşık (10)
| Lin, Beverley, Jones & García (2)
| FedExForum15,246
| 10–5
|- style="background:#cfc;"								
| 16 || November 27 || Atlanta
| 
| Brooks & García (21)
| Ömer Aşık (9)
| Parsons, Howard & Brooks (4)
| Toyota Center18,051
| 11–5
|- style="background:#cfc;"								
| 17 || November 29 || Brooklyn
| 
| Chandler Parsons (21)
| Howard & Jones (7)
| Harden & Brooks (7)
| Toyota Center18,138
| 12–5
|- style="background:#cfc;"								
| 18 || November 30 || @ San Antonio
| 
| James Harden (31)
| Terrence Jones (16)
| James Harden (6)
| AT&T Center18,581
| 13–5

|- style="background:#fcc;"								
| 19 || December 2 || @ Utah
| 
| James Harden (37)
| Dwight Howard (9)
| James Harden (8)
| EnergySolutions Arena15,801
| 13–6	
|- style="background:#fcc;"
| 20 || December 4 || Phoenix
| 
| Aaron Brooks (17)
| Dwight Howard (18)
| Aaron Brooks (6)
| Toyota Center18,151
| 13–7
|- style="background:#cfc;"								
| 21 || December 6 || Golden State
| 
| James Harden (34)
| Dwight Howard (18)
| Chandler Parsons (5)
| Toyota Center18,145
| 14–7	
|- style="background:#cfc;"								
| 22 || December 8 || Orlando
| 
| James Harden (27)
| Dwight Howard (22)
| James Harden (10)
| Toyota Center16,407
| 15–7	
|- style="background:#fcc;"
| 23 || December 12 || @ Portland
| 
| Dwight Howard (32)
| Dwight Howard (17)
| James Harden (7)
| Moda Center19,997
| 15–8
|- style="background:#cfc;"
| 24 || December 13 || @ Golden State
| 
| James Harden (26)
| Dwight Howard (11)
| James Harden (9)
| Oracle Arena19,596
| 16–8
|- style="background:#fcc;"								
| 25 || December 15 || @ Sacramento
| 
| James Harden (25)
| Dwight Howard (10)
| Chandler Parsons (5)
| Sleep Train Arena15,606
| 16–9	
|- style="background:#cfc;"
| 26 || December 18 || Chicago
| 
| Dwight Howard (23)
| Howard & Parsons (9)
| Harden & Jones (6)
| Toyota Center18,242
| 17–9
|- style="background:#fcc;"								
| 27 || December 20 || @ Indiana
| 
| Dwight Howard (19)
| Dwight Howard (12)
| Harden, Howard & Parsons (2)
| Bankers Life Fieldhouse18,165
| 17–10	
|- style="background:#cfc;"								
| 28 || December 21 || @ Detroit
| 
| Dwight Howard (35)
| Dwight Howard (19)
| Brooks & Casspi (7)
| The Palace of Auburn Hills14,606
| 18–10	
|- style="background:#fcc;"								
| 29 || December 23 || Dallas
| 
| Dwight Howard (29)
| Dwight Howard (15)
| Francisco García (6)
| Toyota Center18,328
| 18–11	
|- style="background:#cfc;"								
| 30 || December 25 || @ San Antonio
| 
| James Harden (28)
| Dwight Howard (20)
| Jeremy Lin (8)
| AT&T Center18,581
| 19–11	
|- style="background:#cfc;"								
| 31 || December 26 || Memphis
| 
| James Harden (27)
| Chandler Parsons (11)
| Harden & Parsons (5)
| Toyota Center18,201
| 20–11	
|- style="background:#cfc;"								
| 32 || December 28 || New Orleans
| 
| Dwight Howard (24)
| Dwight Howard (18)
| Jeremy Lin (5)
| Toyota Center18,233
| 21–11	
|- style="background:#fcc;"								
| 33 || December 29 || @ Oklahoma City
| 
| Aaron Brooks (17)
| Howard & Jones (9)
| James Harden (3)
| Chesapeake Energy Arena18,203
| 21–12
|- style="background:#fcc;"								
| 34 || December 31 || Sacramento
| 
| James Harden (38)
| Terrence Jones (11)
| Jeremy Lin (6)
| Toyota Center18,232
| 21–13	

|- style="background:#cfc;"								
| 35 || January 3 || New York
| 
| James Harden (37)
| Chandler Parsons (11)
| James Harden (6)
| Toyota Center18,304
| 22–13	
|- style="background:#cfc;"								
| 36 || January 8 || L.A Lakers
| 
| James Harden (38)
| Howard & Jones (13)
| Harden, Lin & Casspi (4)
| Toyota Center18,229
| 23–13	
|- style="background:#fcc;"								
| 37 || January 10 || @ Atlanta
| 
| James Harden (25)
| Dwight Howard (11)
| James Harden (7)
| Philips Arena13,115
| 23–14	
|- style="background:#cfc;"								
| 38 || January 11 || @ Washington
| 
| James Harden (25)
| Dwight Howard (11)
| Jeremy Lin (8)
| Verizon Center17,454
| 24–14
|- style="background:#cfc;"								
| 39 || January 13 || @ Boston
| 
| Dwight Howard (32)
| Dwight Howard (12)
| Jeremy Lin (9)
| TD Garden17,750
| 25–14	
|- style="background:#cfc;"								
| 40 || January 15 || @ New Orleans
| 
| James Harden (26)
| Dwight Howard (11)
| James Harden (7)
| New Orleans Arena15,918
| 26–14
|- style="background:#fcc;"								
| 41 || January 16 || Oklahoma City
| 
| James Harden & Terrence Jones (16)
| Terrence Jones (13)
| James Harden (8)
| Toyota Center18,231
| 26–15
|- style="background:#cfc;"								
| 42 || January 18 || Milwaukee
| 
| Terrence Jones (36)
| Dwight Howard (14)
| Harden, Lin & Brooks (4)
| Toyota Center18,082
| 27–15
|- style="background:#cfc;"								
| 43 || January 20 || Portland
| 
| Chandler Parsons (31)
| Dwight Howard (12)
| Chandler Parsons (7)
| Toyota Center18,135
| 28–15
|- style="background:#cfc;"
| 44 || January 22 || Sacramento
| 
| Dwight Howard (26)
| Dwight Howard (13)
| James Harden (9)
| Toyota Center16,488
| 29–15
|- style="background:#fcc;"
| 45 || January 24 || Memphis
| 
| Chandler Parsons (34)
| Dwight Howard (12)
| James Harden (13)
| Toyota Center16,998
| 29–16
|- style="background:#fcc;"
| 46 || January 25 || @ Memphis
| 
| James Harden (16)
| Dwight Howard (12)
| Harden, Lin & Jones (3)
| FedExForum17,512
| 29–17
|- style="background:#cfc;"								
| 47 || January 28 || San Antonio
| 
| Dwight Howard (23)
| Dwight Howard (16)
| Jeremy Lin (8)
| Toyota Center18,314
| 30–17	
|- style="background:#cfc;"								
| 48 || January 29 || @ Dallas
| 
| Chandler Parsons (26)
| Donatas Motiejūnas (13)
| Jeremy Lin (7)
| American Airlines Center19,359
| 31–17	

|- style="background:#cfc;"									
| 49 || February 1 || Cleveland
| 
| James Harden (28)
| Jeremy Lin (11)
| Jeremy Lin (10)
| Toyota Center18,309
| 32–17		
|- style="background:#cfc;"								
| 50 || February 5 || Phoenix
| 
| Dwight Howard (34)
| Dwight Howard (14)
| Chandler Parsons (6)
| Toyota Center18,217
| 33–17		
|- style="background:#cfc;"								
| 51 || February 8 || @ Milwaukee
| 
| Dwight Howard (27)
| Dwight Howard (13)
| Dwight Howard (5)
| BMO Harris Bradley Center15,923
| 34–17		
|- style="background:#cfc;"
| 52 || February 10 || @ Minnesota
| 
| Chandler Parsons (20)
| Dwight Howard (15)
| Jeremy Lin (7)
| Target Center12,002
| 35–17	 
|- style="background:#cfc;"
| 53 || February 12 || Washington
| 
| James Harden (35)
| Dwight Howard (16)
| Harden & Parsons (6)
| Toyota Center18,314
| 36–17	
|- align="center"
|colspan="9" bgcolor="#bbcaff"|All-Star Break
|- style="background:#cfc;"
| 54 || February 19 || @ L.A Lakers
| 
| James Harden (29)
| Dwight Howard (13)
| James Harden (11)
| Staples Center18,997
| 37–17
|- style="background:#fcc;"
| 55 || February 20 || @ Golden State
| 
| James Harden (39)
| Dwight Howard (21)
| Harden & Parsons (5)
| Oracle Arena19,596
| 37–18
|- style="background:#cfc;"
| 56 || February 23 || @ Phoenix
| 
| Dwight Howard (25)
| Dwight Howard (9)
| Harden & Parsons (7)
| US Airways Center15,510
| 38–18	
|- style="background:#cfc;"							
| 57 || February 25 || @ Sacramento
| 
| James Harden (43)
| Dwight Howard (11)
| James Harden (8)
| Sleep Train Arena16,057
| 39–18	
|- style="background:#fcc;"							
| 58 || February 26 || @ L.A Clippers
| 
| Dwight Howard (23)
| Dwight Howard (11)
| Harden, Lin & Parsons (3)
| Staples Center19,258
| 39–19

|- style="background:#cfc;"
| 59
| March 1
|  Detroit
| 
| Terrence Jones (22)
| Terrence Jones (10)
| James Harden (12)
| Toyota Center18,330
| 40–19
|- style="background:#cfc;"
| 60 
| March 4
| Miami
|  
| Dwight Howard (22)
| Dwight Howard (16)
| James Harden (11)
| Toyota Center18,523
| 41–19
|- style="background:#cfc;"
| 61 
| March 5
| @ Orlando
| 
| James Harden (31)
| Dwight Howard (13)
| Chandler Parsons (7)
| Amway Center16,012
| 42–19
|- style="background:#cfc;"
| 62 
| March 7
|  Indiana
| 
| James Harden (28)
| Dwight Howard (7)
| Chandler Parsons (6)
| Toyota Center18,332
| 43–19
|- style="background:#cfc;"
| 63 
| March 9
|  Portland
| 
| James Harden (41)
| Dwight Howard (12)
| James Harden (6)
| Toyota Center18,321
| 44–19
|- style="background:#fcc;"
| 64 
| March 11
| @ Oklahoma City
| 
| James Harden (28)
| Dwight Howard (10)
| James Harden (9)
| Chesapeake Energy Arena18,203
| 44–20
|- style="background:#fcc;"
| 65 
| March 13
| @ Chicago
| 
| Jeremy Lin (21)
| Dwight Howard (10)
| Lin & Beverley (3)
| United Center21,747
| 44–21
|- style="background:#fcc;"
| 66 
| March 16
| @ Miami
| 
| James Harden (30)
| Dwight Howard (14)
| Parsons, Howard & Beverley (5)
| American Airlines Arena19,666
| 44–22
|- style="background:#cfc;"
| 67 
| March 17
| Utah
| 
| Terrence Jones (30)
| Aşık & Motiejūnas (11)
| Jeremy Lin (9)
| Toyota Center18,156
| 45–22
|- style="background:#cfc;"
| 68 
| March 20
|  Minnesota
| 
| James Harden (28)
| Chandler Parsons (9)
| Jeremy Lin (10)
| Toyota Center18,315
| 46–22
|- style="background:#cfc;"
| 69
| March 22
| @ Cleveland
| 
| James Harden (37)
| Ömer Aşık (9)
| James Harden (11)
| Quicken Loans Arena19,058
| 47–22
|- style="background:#cfc;"
| 70 
| March 24
| @ Charlotte
| 
| James Harden (31)
| Dwight Howard (10)
| James Harden (5)
| Time Warner Cable Arena15,511
| 48–22
|- style="background:#cfc;"
| 71 
| March 27
| Philadelphia
| 
| James Harden (26)
| Dwight Howard (13)
| James Harden (10)
| Toyota Center18,334
| 49–22
|- style="background:#fcc;"
| 72 
| March 29
| L.A Clippers
| 
| James Harden (32)
| Ömer Aşık (11)
| James Harden (6)
| Toyota Center18,337
| 49–23

|- style="background:#fcc;"
| 73
| April 1
| @ Brooklyn
| 
| James Harden (26)
| Ömer Aşık (23)
| James Harden (7)
| Barclays Center17,732
| 49–24
|- style="background:#fcc;"
| 74
| April 2
| @ Toronto
| 
| James Harden (26)
| Ömer Aşık (15)
| Jeremy Lin (7)
| Air Canada Centre18,294
| 49–25
|- style="background:#cfc;"
| 75 
| April 4
| Oklahoma City
| 
| James Harden (39)
| Ömer Aşık (12)
| James Harden (7)
| Toyota Center18,407
| 50–25
|- style="background:#cfc;"
| 76 
| April 6
| Denver
| 
| James Harden (32)
| Ömer Aşık (23)
| James Harden (10)
| Toyota Center18,325
| 51–25
|- style="background:#cfc;"
| 77 
| April 8
| @ L.A Lakers
| 
| Harden & Jones (33)
| Aşık & Motiejūnas (15)
| James Harden (12)
| Staples Center18,131
| 52–25
|- style="background:#fcc;"
| 78 
| April 9
| @ Denver
| 
| Jeremy Lin (18)
| Ömer Aşık (12)
| Harden, Lin & Canaan (6)
| Pepsi Center15,322
| 52–26
|- style="background:#fcc;"
| 79 
| April 11
| @ Minnesota
| 
| James Harden (33)
| Ömer Aşık (15)
| James Harden (10)
| Target Center16,689
| 52–27
|- style="background:#cfc;"
| 80 
| April 12
| New Orleans
| 
| James Harden (33)
| Ömer Aşık (8)
| James Harden (13)
| Toyota Center18,372
| 53–27
|- style="background:#cfc;"
| 81 
| April 14
| San Antonio
| 
| Chandler Parsons (21)
| Dwight Howard (17)
| James Harden (7)
| Toyota Center18,406
| 54–27
|- style="background:#fcc;"
| 82 
| April 16
| @ New Orleans
| 
| Troy Daniels (22)
| Donatas Motiejūnas (10)
| Troy Daniels (5)
| Smoothie King Center17,421
| 54–28

Playoffs

Game log

|- align="center" bgcolor="#ffcccc"
| 1
| April 20
| Portland
| L 120–122 (OT)
| Harden, Howard (27)
| Dwight Howard (15)
| James Harden (6)
| Toyota Center18,240
| 0–1
|- align="center" bgcolor="#ffcccc"
| 2
| April 23
| Portland
| L 105–112
| Dwight Howard (32) 
| Dwight Howard (14) 
| Jeremy Lin (5) 
| Toyota Center18,331
| 0–2
|- align="center" bgcolor="#ccffcc"
| 3
| April 25
| @ Portland
| W 121–116 (OT)
| James Harden (37)
| Dwight Howard (14)
| Harden, Lin (6)
| Moda Center20,302
| 1–2
|- align="center" bgcolor="#ffcccc"
| 4
| April 27
| @ Portland
| L 120–123 (OT)
| James Harden (28)
| Dwight Howard (14)
| James Harden (6)
| Moda Center20,246
| 1–3
|- align="center" bgcolor="#ccffcc"
| 5
| April 30
| Portland
| W 108–98 
| Dwight Howard (22)
| Ömer Aşık (15)
| James Harden (7)
| Toyota Center18,230
| 2–3
|- align="center" bgcolor="#ffcccc"
| 6
| May 2
| @ Portland
| L 98–99 
| James Harden (34)
| Chandler Parsons (12)
| James Harden (6)
| Moda Center20,204
| 2–4

Standings

Transactions

Additions

References

Houston Rockets (NBA.com)

External links

Houston Rockets seasons
Houston Rockets